James Joseph Hamula (born November 20, 1957) is an American attorney and former general authority of the Church of Jesus Christ of Latter-day Saints (LDS Church).

Following church disciplinary action by the First Presidency and Quorum of the Twelve Apostles, Hamula was released from his calling as a general authority and excommunicated from the LDS Church on August 8, 2017.

Early life and education 
Hamula's father was Joseph Hamula, a son of Hungarian immigrants who grew up in a heavily-Magyar-speaking area of metro Cleveland, Ohio.

Hamula was born and raised in Long Beach, California. He later served as an LDS Church missionary in the Germany Munich Mission. After his mission, he received a bachelor's degree in political science and philosophy, a master's degree in political philosophy, and a Juris Doctor, all from Brigham Young University in Provo, Utah.

For one summer while studying law, Hamula completed an internship in Mesa, Arizona.

Career 
Hamula has spent most of his career working for the Arizona-based law firm of Gallagher & Kennedy. He was largely involved in Superfund and other environmental law issues.

LDS Church service
In the LDS Church, Hamula served as elders quorum president, bishop, stake high councilor, and stake Young Men president. He also served as president of the Mesa Arizona Salt River Stake and as the first president of the Mesa Arizona Red Mountain Stake when it was organized in 1992.

From 1994 to 1997, Hamula was president of the church's Washington D.C. South Mission. From 2000 to 2008, Hamula was an area seventy in the church's North America Southwest Area.  He became a member of the First Quorum of the Seventy during the church's April 2008 general conference. After serving first as a counselor in the area, from 2011 to 2014 he served as president of the church's Pacific Area headquartered in Auckland, New Zealand.

On August 8, 2017, Hamula was excommunicated from the church.  While the church's news release did not specify the reason for his excommunication, it did state that it was not the result of personal apostasy or disillusionment on Hamula's part. Hamula is the first general authority of the LDS Church to be excommunicated since George P. Lee in 1989.

Personal life 
Hamula met his wife, Joyce Anderson, as a legal intern. They married in the Mesa Arizona Temple in 1994. They have six children.

References

Bibliography
 2008 Deseret Morning News Church Almanac (Salt Lake City, Utah: Deseret Morning News, 2007) p. 192
 "Elder James J. Hamula," Liahona, May 2008, p. 136

External links 
 Grampa Bill's G.A. Pages: James J. Hamula
 James J. Hamula, "The Quest for Wisdom," Ensign, July 2002, p. 40
James J. Hamula, "His Grace Is Sufficient for You", July 2, 2014
James J. Hamula, "Winning the War Against Evil", Ensign, November 2008

1957 births
American general authorities (LDS Church)
American Mormon missionaries in the United States
American people of Hungarian descent
American Mormon missionaries in Germany
Members of the First Quorum of the Seventy (LDS Church)
Living people
Arizona lawyers
J. Reuben Clark Law School alumni
People from Long Beach, California
Area seventies (LDS Church)
20th-century Mormon missionaries
Religious leaders from Arizona
Religious leaders from California
People excommunicated by the Church of Jesus Christ of Latter-day Saints
Excommunicated general authorities (LDS Church)